An annular solar eclipse occurred on November 11, 1901. A solar eclipse occurs when the Moon passes between Earth and the Sun, thereby totally or partly obscuring the image of the Sun for a viewer on Earth. An annular solar eclipse occurs when the Moon's apparent diameter is smaller than the Sun's, blocking most of the Sun's light and causing the Sun to look like an annulus (ring). An annular eclipse appears as a partial eclipse over a region of the Earth thousands of kilometres wide. Annularity was visible from the Italian island Sicily, the whole British Malta (now Malta), Ottoman Tripolitania (now Libya), Egypt, Ottoman Empire (parts now belonging to Cretan State in Greece, Israel, Jordan and Saudi Arabia), Emirate of Jabal Shammar (now belonging to Saudi Arabia), Aden Protectorate (now belonging to Yemen), Muscat and Oman (now Oman), British Raj (the parts now belonging to India, Andaman and Nicobar Islands and Myanmar), British Ceylon (now Sri Lanka), Siam (name changed to Thailand later), French Indochina (the parts now belonging to Cambodia, southern tip of Laos and southern Vietnam, including Phnom Penh), Bombay Reef in the Paracel Islands, and Philippines.

Related eclipses

Solar eclipses 1901–1902

Saros 141

Inex series

Notes

References

1901 11 11
1901 in science
1901 11 11
November 1901 events